Yao Mingyue (born March 9, 1993) is a Chinese curler.

Career

Juniors
Yao represented China in three Pacific-Asia Junior Curling Championships, playing lead for the team in 2012 and 2014 and was the alternate in 2013. She would make the playoffs each year winning a bronze medal in 2012 and silver in 2013 and 2014.

Women's
Yao first represented China at the women's level when she was a member of the team at the 2017 Pacific-Asia Curling Championships. She played second on that team, skipped by Jiang Yilun. The team finished the round robin with a 8–2 record, which qualified them for the playoffs. The team would go on to lose the semifinal to Japan's Satsuki Fujisawa but would win the bronze medal after defeating Hong Kong. Her first World Women's Curling Championships was in 2018, as the alternate for the team skipped by Jiang Yilun. The team finished the round robin with a 6–6 record, just missing the playoffs. The next season, Yao won the 2019 World Qualification Event with her team, skipped by Mei Jie which qualified them for the 2019 World Women's Curling Championship. There, they qualified for the playoffs with a 7–5 record before losing their qualification game to Switzerland's Silvana Tirinzoni who went on to win the event. They did not play many events during the 2019–20 season as the junior Han Yu rink were named as the Chinese National Team. They played in two tour events at the start of the season, the Hokkaido Bank Curling Classic and the Advics Cup, finishing third and second respectively.

Teams

References

External links

Living people
1993 births
Chinese female curlers
21st-century Chinese women